The Lovers is a 1958 French drama film directed by Louis Malle which stars Jeanne Moreau, Alain Cuny, and Jean-Marc Bory. Based on the posthumously-published 1876 short story "Point de Lendemain" by Dominique Vivant (1747-1825), the film concerns a woman involved in adultery who rediscovers human love. The Lovers was Malle's second feature film, made when he was 25 years old. The film was a box-office hit in France when released theatrically, gaining 2,594,160 admissions in France alone. The film was highly controversial when released in the United States for its depiction of allegedly obscene material. At the 1958 Venice Film Festival, the film won the Special Jury Prize and was nominated for the Golden Lion.

Plot
Jeanne Tournier (Moreau) lives with her husband Henri (Alain Cuny) and young daughter, Catherine, in a mansion near Dijon. Her emotionally remote husband is a busy newspaper owner who has little time for his wife, except when he chooses to place demands upon her; often they sleep in separate rooms. Jeanne escapes to Paris regularly when she can spend time with her chic friend Maggy (Judith Magre) and the polo-playing Raoul (José Luis de Vilallonga), Maggy's friend and Jeanne's lover.

Jeanne's constant talk of Maggy and Raoul leads to Henri demanding that Jeanne invite them to dinner and to stay as overnight guests. Jeanne's car breaks down on the day of the dinner party, and she accepts a lift from a younger man, Bernard (Jean-Marc Bory), and then asks him to drive her home. By the time they get back, Maggy and Raoul have already arrived at the mansion. It transpires that Bernard, an archaeologist, is the son of a friend of Jeanne's husband, and he too is added to the guest list. Jeanne spurns Raoul's advances, claiming it is too dangerous, but she spends time in a small boat on the river with the attentive Bernard. Clandestinely, they spend the night together. In the morning, to the surprise of everyone, Jeanne leaves with Bernard for a new life.

Cast
 Jeanne Moreau as Jeanne Tournier
 Jean-Marc Bory as Bernard Dubois-Lambert
 Judith Magre as Maggy Thiebaut-Leroy
 José Luis de Vilallonga as Raoul Flores
 Gaston Modot as Coudray
 Pierre Frag
 Michèle Girardon as La secrétaire
 Gib Grossac
 Lucienne Hamon as Chantal
 Georgette Lobre as Marthe
 Claude Mansard as Marcelot
 Alain Cuny as Henri Tournier

Critical reception
John Simon described The Lovers as  "undistinguished but sexy".

American obscenity case

The film is important in American legal history as it resulted in a court case that questioned the definition of obscenity. A showing of the film in Cleveland Heights, Ohio's Coventry Village resulted in a criminal conviction of the theatre manager for public depiction of obscene material. He appealed his conviction to the United States Supreme Court, which reversed the conviction and ruled that the film was not obscene in its written opinion (Jacobellis v. Ohio). The case resulted in Justice Potter Stewart's famously subjective definition of hard-core pornography: "I know it when I see it."  (Stewart did not consider the film to be such.)

References

External links
 
 
 
 
The Lovers: Succès de scandale an essay by Ginette Vincendeau at the Criterion Collection

1958 films
Adultery in films
Films directed by Louis Malle
French romantic drama films
1950s French-language films
1958 romantic drama films
Venice Grand Jury Prize winners
United States pornography law
Obscenity controversies in film
Films based on French novels
1950s French films